Sanglechi is an Iranian language spoken in villages in the Zebak District of Afghanistan: Dashte Rubat, Esketul, Faruq, Flaxmadek, Sar-Sanglech, and Takya. It is also spoken in Tajikistan, where it is called Sanglich.  The name comes from the Sanglech valley in which many of the people live. The language is closely related to the Munjani and Pashto languages of Afghanistan.

References

Pamir languages
Pamir languages of Afghanistan
Languages of Tajikistan
Eastern Iranian languages